Route 187 is a  secondary state route in the U.S. states of Connecticut and Massachusetts. It begins in the city of Hartford at Albany Avenue (US 44), travels north through the towns of Bloomfield, Windsor, East Granby and Suffield until the Connecticut-Massachusetts state line. Route 187 continues north across the state line through Agawam into Westfield, where the route ends at US 20 east of Westfield center. Route 187 crosses the Farmington River between the towns of Bloomfield and East Granby.

Route description

Route 187 begins at an intersection with US 44 in Hartford and heads north, crossing into Bloomfield.  In Bloomfield, it continues north and northwest through the eastern part of town, crossing Routes 218, 178, and the western end of Route 305 before briefly clipping the northwest corner of Windsor.  It the reenters Bloomfield,  where it briefly overlaps with Route 189 to form a short freeway. Route 187 leaves the freeway to the north, and crosses the Farmington River into East Granby.  In East Granby, it continues north-northeast across the town, crossing Route 20 in the town center before crossing into Suffield.  In Suffield, it continues north-northeast through the village of West Suffield, where it intersects Route 168 before crossing the Massachusetts state line.

Route 187 enters Massachusetts in Agawam as Pine Street. In Agawam, Route 187 has a junction with the west end of the Route 57 expressway. Route 57 joins Route 187 for about  before continuing west towards Southwick. This junction also marks the western end of Route 147, which carries local traffic toward West Springfield.  Route 187 continues north through the village of Feeding Hills along North Westfield Street. The route veers west as it approaches the Westfield River and begins to follow along the path of the river. The Westfield River and Route 187 bend south then north until it intersects US 20 soon after crossing into the city of Westfield. In Massachusetts, Route 187 is  maintained by the municipal governments of Agawam and Westfield.

History
In the 1920s, modern Route 187 between North Bloomfield (at Route 189) and West Suffield (at Route 168) was part of old State Highway 328. The old route continued east to Suffield Center along modern Route 168. The southern end of modern Route 187 was also part of an alternate route of then New England Route 10 (now Route 189) to Bloomfield center known as State Highway 311. The old route served the Blue Hills community and used Park Avenue (modern Route 178) from Blue Hills Avenue to Bloomfield center.

Connecticut's Route 187 was established in the 1932 state highway renumbering from old Highway 328. The original route began at current Route 189 (then Route 9) in North Bloomfield and continued north to the Massachusetts state line, where the designation was continued by Massachusetts along roughly its modern alignment to US 20 in 1939. In 1955, part of Route 9 was washed away in a flood, and when the roadway was reopened in 1961, Route 187 was shifted slightly to its current route (the original route went along Spoonville Road) and Route 9 was relocated to the current Route 189 south of the Farmington River (the original Route 9 went along the north bank of the river on Tunxis Avenue). The North Bloomfield freeway section of Routes 187 and 189 were opened at this time.  In 1963, Route 187 was extended south to its current southern terminus along a section of old Route 184 (established in 1932 from old Highway 311) and SR 921 (northward continuation of Blue Hills Avenue). In the late 1980s, the southern intersection of Routes 187 and 189 was modified slightly with the construction of a new interchange, resulting in a slight re-routing.

Major intersections

References

External links

187
Transportation in Hartford County, Connecticut
187
Transportation in Hampden County, Massachusetts
Transportation in Hartford, Connecticut
Bloomfield, Connecticut
East Granby, Connecticut
Suffield, Connecticut
Agawam, Massachusetts
Westfield, Massachusetts